GreenXC, established in 2011, is an organization that works to raise awareness for National Parks, National Forests and the National Park Foundation, the official charity of America’s nearly 400 national parks. It focuses on the youth and reaches out to connect them to the parks and forests in order to ensure the parks are supported for the next generation of taxpayers. GreenXC aligns itself with the National Park Foundation's goal of being "deeply committed to engaging the country's youth into a lifelong experience with the parks."

GreenXC also works closely with the USDA United States Forest Service on setting destinations for their cross-country awareness campaign during the summer of 2011. They will be visiting and touring various sites and conducting interviews which they will share with their readers through their site. The purpose of the campaign is to encourage the young generation to have a more active involvement with their environment.

Project Summer 2011 - Rideshare Cross Country

In 2011, GreenXC traveled cross country to raise awareness for the National Parks and United States National Forests.

"GreenXC will collect and document the stories of the people who help turn these ambitions into a reality. The experiences will be shared through daily blog posts and video footage on YouTube." Those following can interact and donate directly to the parks visited. The route of the trip will be crowd sourced through suggestions on Twitter, Facebook, the GreenXC blog/forum and social sites like Reddit.

Focus on Young Generation

GreenXC aligns itself with the Federal Government's goal of promoting the National Parks and Forests to the young generation. In 2011, the President set as one of the top goals of the Federal Government to promote the great outdoors and especially to the youth. "Special attention should be given to bringing young Americans into the conversation."

References

External links

Conservation projects
Sustainable transport
Hitchhiking
Transport culture
2011 establishments in the United States